Events from the year 1388 in Ireland.

Incumbent
Lord: Richard II

Events
Robert Preston, 1st Baron Gormanston appointed Lord Chancellor of Ireland
Richard Plunkett  appointed Lord Chancellor of Ireland

Births

Deaths

 
1380s in Ireland
Ireland
Years of the 14th century in Ireland